The Royal Insurance Corporation of Bhutan (RICB) is an insurance corporation based in Thimphu, Bhutan.
It was established on 7 January 1975 under the Charter of the fourth Druk Gyalpo Jigme Singye Wangchuk to assist in the economic development of the nation by providing insurance.

External links
Official site

Thimphu
Government-owned insurance companies
Financial services companies established in 1975
Insurance companies of Bhutan
1975 establishments in Bhutan
Companies based in Thimphu
Companies listed on the Royal Securities Exchange of Bhutan